Idia forbesii, or Forbes' idia moth, is a litter moth of the family Erebidae. The species was first described by George Hazen French in 1894. It is found in North America from Wisconsin to Quebec, south to Florida and Texas.

The wingspan is about 17 mm. There is one generation in the north and multiple generations in the south.

Larvae feed on detritus, including dead leaves.

References

External links
Original description: 

Herminiinae
Moths of North America
Moths described in 1894